Greg Byrnes (born 19 January 1987 in Atherton, Queensland) is an Australian rugby league player. He currently plays for the Northern Pride in the Queensland Cup and the North Queensland Cowboys in the NRL.

He made his debut for the Cowboys in Round 15 of 2008 against the Melbourne Storm.

Statistics

Club career

References

1987 births
Living people
Australian rugby league players
North Queensland Cowboys players
Northern Pride RLFC players
Redcliffe Dolphins players
Rugby league props
Sportsmen from Queensland
Rugby league players from Queensland